Agata Rosłońska (born 20 December 1983) is a Polish former competitive ice dancer. With skating partner Michał Tomaszewski, she qualified to the free dance at three World Junior Championships. She started skating at the age of 4.

Programs 
(with Tomaszewski)

Competitive highlights
 with Tomaszewski

References

External links
 

1983 births
Living people
Polish female ice dancers
Sportspeople from Łódź